Luis Héctor Álvarez Álvarez (October 25, 1919 – May 18, 2016) was a Mexican industrialist and politician. Álvarez was a member of the National Action Party. In 1958 he was a candidate for the Presidency of Mexico. He has also served as Mayor of Chihuahua, president of his party and was the coordinator of the dialogues for peace in Chiapas.

Political career 

Luis Héctor Álvarez dedicated most of his life to the textile industry. He first became involved in politics in Ciudad Juárez. In 1956 the PAN nominated him as candidate to Governor of Chihuahua. He lost the election to PRI candidate Teófilo Borunda. After the election an electoral fraud was claimed by Álvarez and his party. In an act of civil disobedience, Alvarez headed a caravan from Chihuahua to Mexico City.
In 1958, he ran as the PAN candidate in the federal election against Adolfo López Mateos where he lost.

Municipal President of Chihuahua 
In the following years Álvarez dedicated himself mainly to his private enterprise, until 1983 when he was elected Municipal President of Chihuahua. As an opposition figure, Álvarez constantly clashed with the state and federal governments. Álvarez claimed he was not given the proper legal resources and participation in his city's decisions. In protest, Álvarez started a hunger strike that lasted 40 days. The strike also contested the 1986 elections in Chihuahua in which opposition parties claimed an electoral fraud had taken place once again.

PAN party president 
In 1987 he was elected 14th president of the PAN party and in 1990 he won the re-election.
His tenure as president of the party is controversial. His supporters claim that during his administration the party became the strongest opposition force in Mexican politics. His detractors on the other hand claim that his party strayed away from its original doctrine and was now run by the “neo-panistas” (e.g. Manuel Clouthier, Vicente Fox, Francisco Barrio Terrazas and Ernesto Ruffo Appel). Prominent party members, including Pablo Emilio Madero, Jesus González Schmal, Jose González Torres and Bernardo Bátiz, left the PAN in protest arguing that Álvarez's policy of dialogue with Carlos Salinas de Gortari legitimized his government which was under intense national criticism of perpetrating an electoral fraud.

Senate 
He was elected to the Senate for Chihuahua from 1994 to 2000, during which period he served as a member of the Commission of Concord and Pacification in Chiapas that was in charge of the peace negotiation between the Federal Government and the Zapatista Army of National Liberation. In 2000, President Vicente Fox designated him Coordinator of the Dialogue for La Paz in Chiapas.
During this time he never was able to contact the leadership of the EZLN.

On December 15, 2006, President Felipe Calderón Hinojosa designated him head of the Commission for the Development of the Indigenous People.

Family 
Álvarez's wife, Blanca Magrassi Scagno, an activist and important figure within the PAN, died on October 9, 2015, at the age of 92.

References

External links 
 Biography of Luis H. Álvarez

 
	 

|-

1919 births
2016 deaths
National Action Party (Mexico) politicians
Mexican democracy activists
Municipal presidents of Chihuahua
Candidates in the 1958 Mexican presidential election
Members of the Senate of the Republic (Mexico)
People from Camargo, Chihuahua
Mexican businesspeople
People from Chihuahua City
Mexican industrialists
Politicians from Chihuahua (state)
20th-century Mexican politicians